The Western Force is an Australian professional rugby union team based in Perth, Western Australia, currently competing in Super Rugby Pacific. They previously played in Super Rugby from 2006 until they were axed from the competition in 2017. Following their axing they played in the National Rugby Championship in 2018 and 2019, replacing the Perth Spirit, and Global Rapid Rugby from 2018 to 2020, an Indo-Pacific competition organised by Andrew Forrest.

Following the cancellation of both the 2020 Super Rugby season and 2020 Global Rapid Rugby season due to the COVID-19 pandemic, the Western Force were invited to compete in the 2020 Super Rugby AU season, a domestic competition organised by Rugby Australia to replace the cancelled Super Rugby season. The Force competed in the 2021 Super Rugby AU season and Super Rugby Trans-Tasman, before being confirmed that their return to Super Rugby will be permanent in the revamped 2022 Super Rugby Pacific season.

History

The bid

The bid for entry into an expanded Super 12 competition started in the early 2000s, when in 2002, a group was formed to oversee developments in the push for a new Australian franchise. The group's objective was to ensure that if SANZAR agreed to a fourth Australian franchise, that RugbyWA would be ready. RugbyWA were invited to bid for the fourth Australian team, and the union assembled a project team, which was given four weeks to formulate their bid. The bid was backed by the state government, which loaned more than one million dollars to RugbyWA, as well as committing $25 million towards an upgrade of the Members Equity Stadium. It was announced in December 2004 that RugbyWA had beaten Rugby Union Victoria for the right to host the fourth Australian franchise.

The first season

On 10 February the Western Force made their 2006 season rugby debut against the Brumbies at a near sold out Subiaco Oval in Perth, losing 25–10.  After this result, the Force had a difficult debut in Super 14. A one-sided loss to the Hurricanes and an ugly loss at home to the Chiefs in Perth followed. Many fans were unimpressed, with only approximately 23,000 turning up to watch a match against the Bulls. On 31 March, in front of 24,000, the Force came closest to their first win, losing 26–25 to the Stormers at Subiaco Oval. This was after leading 10–0 early on in the match. This was the Force's first competition point ever, and was the longest it had ever taken a side to get a point in Super rugby history (8 rounds/7 matches).

On 21 April a crowd of 32,231 saw the Force nearly pull off the upset of the year, drawing 23-all with the undefeated defending champion Crusaders. Though the Force were leading 7–0 after several minutes the feeling was still that the Crusaders would win, especially after they scored a try seconds later to make it 7–5. Only when the Force had blown the score out to 17–5 did anyone begin to talk of an upset. Leading 20–8 at half time the Force did not hold on for the win after the Crusaders scored two tries and a penalty within the closing half. At 23-all with seconds left the Force crashed over the line but were denied by the television match official.

Two days after the draw with the Crusaders, the Force were able to sign rising star Matt Giteau from the Brumbies, effective with the 2007 season. Giteau, whose contract with the Brumbies ended after the 2006 season, inked a three-year deal reportedly worth A$4.5 million, making him the highest-paid player in the history of any Australian football code.

On Saturday 6 May the Force announced they had managed to sign another player, Reds winger Drew Mitchell. However, during the same week the Force were fined $110,000 after an "independent committee found that Rugby WA had entered a negotiation process with Al Kanaar in a way that was contrary to and in breach of the contracting protocols." The Force notched up their first win by defeating the Cheetahs 16–14 on 6 May.

Super Rugby years 
The Western Force continued to play in Super Rugby until the 2017 season. During this time they struggled to achieve much success, failing to qualify for the playoffs in a single season. Their best season came in 2007, where they finished 7th out of 14 teams. Ahead of the 2018 Super Rugby season, SANZAAR made the decision to reduce the competition from 18 to 15 teams, deciding to cut 2 South African teams and 1 Australian team. On August 11, 2017 it was announced that the Western Force would be the Australian team to be axed from Super Rugby.

Global Rapid Rugby and National Rugby Championship years
In September 2017, Australian billionaire Andrew Forrest made plans to launch an Indo-Pacific Rugby tournament, consisting of the Western Force and other teams from the Indo-Pacific region.

While organisation of the Indo-Pacific tournament was still underway, Andrew Forrest announced that the Western Force would play a series of matches in 2018 in what would be known as World Series Rugby. The Force played matches against Fiji A, Tonga A, Samoa A, the second tier national sides of those countries, along with the Hong Kong national team, Super Rugby sides Melbourne Rebels and the Crusaders, and Japanese club Panasonic Wild Knights.

Andrew Forrest's Indo-Pacific Rugby tournament was officially announced as Global Rapid Rugby and began in 2019. The inaugural 2019 season consisted of a series of showcase matches with the competition adopting a full home and away round-robin format for the 2020 season. The Western Force played in Global Rapid Rugby against teams from Fiji, Hong Kong, Japan, Malaysia, Samoa and Singapore.

During this time the Western Force also played in the 2018 and 2019 National Rugby Championship seasons, replacing Perth Spirit, who had previously acted as a feeder team for the Force during their Super Rugby years. The National Rugby Championship was Australia's second-tier competition below Super Rugby, taking place after the Super Rugby season and featuring players who were not selected to play for the Australian national team in the test season, similar to New Zealand's Mitre 10 Cup and South Africa's Currie Cup. The Western Force finished 3rd in the 2018 season, being knocked out in the semi-finals, and won the 2019 season, beating the Canberra Vikings 41–3 in the final.

Return to Super Rugby 
Due to the COVID-19 pandemic, the 2020 Global Rapid rugby season, which the Western Force were competing in, was cancelled. The pandemic had also caused the cancellation of the 2020 Super Rugby season, and international travel restrictions meant that it was unfeasible for the competition to continue in its current state, as it consisted of teams from 5 countries. Due to this, Rugby Australia launched a domestic competition known as Super Rugby AU, its inaugural 2020 season featuring the Western Force joining the current four Australian Super Rugby sides in a 12-week round robin tournament that ran from 3 July to 19 September.

The Western Force competed in the 2021 Super Rugby AU season, along with Super Rugby Trans-Tasman, a trans-tasman competition that featured the five Super Rugby AU teams taking on the five Super Rugby Aotearoa teams.

Super Rugby's future is uncertain, but a new, 12 team competition started in 2022. This competition includes the full time return of the Western Force, who competed against the four other Australian Super Rugby sides, the five New Zealand sides, a Fijian-based team Fijian Drua, and Moana Pasifika, a team composed of players with Pacific Islander heritage. The Force missed out on the Finals Series of the inaugural season by a single point.

Name and colours
On 19 April, RugbyWA unveiled the franchise team name as well as the logo, at a reception at the Burswood International Resort in Perth. Months of detailed community involvement went into selecting the name for the team. 'Western Force' was chosen as the name, which best reflected the franchise's location (state) and its 'values of strength, energy and community'. The logo was unveiled to be a black swan, which is the state's traditional insignia. The swan is set in a blue background, representing the Western Australia coastline and sky, whilst the gold represented the beaches, mineral wealth and sunshine. Some speculated that the team was going to be called the 'Black Swans'.

In July at function at the same venue as where the logo was unveiled to the public, the Force's jersey and naming rights sponsor was revealed. The home jersey was unveiled on Brendan Cannon, being blue with a black swan. Lachlan MacKay emerged with the side's alternate strip, which was gold with a black swan; black and gold being the State colours of Western Australia. The team's first jersey was auctioned off for $30,000, and the first alternate strip was then also auctioned off for $30,000 as well.

Logo
In March 2018, a new renewed Western Force changed their logo and jersey. The logo was very similar to the previous logo, this came after being axed from their most recent season of Super Rugby.

Support
Shortly after RugbyWA won the fourth Australian franchise, an on-line register was set up for members to record their interest. In the space of weeks, 10,000 people had registered. When membership was officially launched in July, more than 13,000 were registered, with around 400 companies expressed interest in hospitality packages. Soon the Force had the largest membership base of any of the Australian Super 14 teams. By the time pre-season had started, the Force had 16,000 members.

Australian Rugby Union CEO Gary Flowers told the media that "people power" was a key factor in Western Australia being awarded the franchise ahead of Victoria. Prior to the announcement, more than 25,500 Western Australians signed a petition in support of their state's bid. In addition, 5,000 people, including the state's premier Dr Geoff Gallop, attended a rally at Subiaco Oval, organised by two rugby mothers "the Scrum Mums" (Jennifer Hoskins and Irma Cooper) to show how much the people of Western Australia wanted the franchise. By the end of the first season, the Force finished with the highest crowd average out of all the Australian teams, despite finishing in last place, the fans still came out to see Wallaby stars such as Matt Giteau, Drew Mitchell and Nathan Sharpe (though Mitchell and Giteau were not in the 2006 line-up).

Stadium

For the first four seasons, the Force played all of their home games at Subiaco Oval. The stadium had a capacity of 43,500 configured in an oval shape for Australian rules football.

The club moved to the Perth Oval for the 2010 season and, with association football club Perth Glory, pushed for an upgrade to the venue which would create a rectangular venue for the two clubs. As of 2019, the stadium is known as HBF Park after WA's biggest health insurer took over naming rights at Perth's home of soccer and rugby. The Force were given a limited grant by the government to improve facilities at the stadium, and the capacity was increased to 20,500 in time for the 2010 Super Rugby Season.

Between 2010 and 2011 the State government developed a masterplan for an improved rectangular stadium and then completed a business case which saw $88million dollars allocated to the first stage which was to include a new permanent East stand, new lights, two video replay boards, LED signage at pitch level, replacement of the playing surface and replacement of the south scaffold stand with new scaffold. A Project Definition Plan was then completed and following this, the government allocated a further $7.14million to add corporate amenity including 48 corporate boxes and a 250-seat BBQ deck to the new Eastern stand.

In June 2012 builder BGC were awarded the head building contract for the project and on 7 June 2012 the Minister for Sport and Recreation Terry Waldron MLA announced that hard work by the project team, led by the Department of Sport and Recreation, and a keen price by builders would enable the south stand to become a permanent, unroofed structure rather than new scaffold. It was completed in September 2013, with a capacity of 20,441.

Development teams

RugbyWA's two elite development squads just below full-time professional level are the Western Force A and WA Under 19 teams. These teams are closely aligned with the Western Force and train at McGillvray Oval, the training base used by the Force. RugbyWA also previously fielded a separate National Rugby Championship team, the Perth Spirit, until the end of season 2017 but competed in this tournament as the Western Force from 2018. From 2019 the Development Team, Perth Gold, competes in Emerging State Championship.

Western Force A
The Western Force A team plays matches against interstate and international representative teams, and has also competed in tournaments such as the Pacific Rugby Cup. Teams known by various names over the years including Western Force A, Western Force Gold and Force Academy have been selected from the best emerging rugby talent in Western Australia. The current squad is a mix of Western Force contracted players, Force Academy players from elite youth programs, and selected Premier Grade club rugby players.

In 2006 the Western Force Gold, playing in the traditional gold and black colours of Western Australia, undertook a two-week tour to South Africa. The team played the Golden Lions and Blue Bulls before returning home to Perth to play Manu Samoa and Japanese Top League teams Toshiba and Yamaha. In 2008, the Force Academy beat the Singapore national side by 113–7.

 2019 Emerging States Championship Champions

Under 19
The Western Force under 19 side plays in the URC competition. Western Australian teams played in the Southern States Tournament up until 2015 and also played occasional matches against other representative sides such as Pacific Rugby Cup teams. Prior to 2008, state colts teams at under 21 and under 19 age levels were fielded in national tournament but these teams were consolidated as under 20s ahead of the inaugural World Rugby U20 Championship. In 2018, an under 19 age limit was reinstated for the state colts teams.

Season positions

Super Rugby

National Rugby Championship

Global Rapid Rugby

Notes:
 Summary of all matches in the 2019 Global Rapid Rugby season, including the Asia and Pacific showcases.

Honours
Global Rapid Rugby
Champions: 2019
National Rugby Championship
Champions: 2019
Playoff appearances: 2018
World Club 10s
Champions: 2016

Notes:
 Western Force won both the Asia and Pacific showcases in an undefeated 2019 Global Rapid Rugby season.

Current squad

The squad for the 2023 Super Rugby Pacific season is:

Coaches

As of 28 May 2022.
* denotes combined record across Global Rapid Rugby, National Rugby Championship and all Super Rugby competitions.

Statistics

Competition

Super Rugby

National Rugby Championship

Individual records

Most appearances

Most points

Most tries

Most points in a season

Most tries in a season

Most points in a match

Most tries in a match

Firsts
 First pre-season game – vs the Cheetahs (lost 19–29)
 First season game – Round 1, 2006 vs Brumbies (lost 10–25)
 First try – Scott Fava vs Brumbies
 First points – Scott Daruda (3-point penalty kick) vs Brumbies
 First conversion – Scott Daruda vs Brumbies
 First draw – Round 11, 2006 vs Crusaders (23–23)
 First drop goal – Matt Giteau vs Cheetahs
 First penalty try – Pre-Season 2006 vs Cheetahs (19–29)
 First win – Round 13, 2006 vs Cheetahs (16–14)
 First home win – Round 6, 2007 vs the Hurricanes (18–17)

Controversies

Eye-witness accounts stated that the players had mishandled the animals, including trapping and throwing them, though none were known to be seriously injured. Alcohol was said to be a factor.

As a result of the actions, Australian Wallaby number 8 Fava was ordered to pay $11,000, attend a week of community service and undergo counselling for alcohol abuse, while flanker Richard Brown was sentenced to a $5000 fine as well as seven days' community service. Both fines were payable to the Rottnest Island Conservation Foundation.

In February 2008, Matt Henjak and Haig Sare were involved in a fight at a pub in Perth. Henjak hit Sare and broke his jaw and was sacked by the Force for misconduct. Haig Sare returned to play for the Force at the end of Season 2008 once his injuries healed.

Firepower funding debacle
Sponsorship payments from the fuel technology company Firepower were a major factor in luring Wallaby star Matt Giteau and others to play for the Western Force in Perth. The luckless Giteau was one of a number of sportsmen owed millions of dollars after the collapse of Firepower.
A new consortium offered to cover the Firepower money if Giteau extended his existing contract, however he chose not to, and returned to Canberra to play for the Brumbies.

See also

 Rugby union in Western Australia

References

External links
 

 
Sporting clubs in Perth, Western Australia
Super Rugby teams
Rugby union teams in Western Australia
Representative sports teams of Western Australia
Rugby clubs established in 2005
2005 establishments in Australia